Live at the Half Note may refer to:
 Live at the Half-Note, a 1964 album by Art Farmer's Quartet
 Live at the Half Note (Lee Konitz album), recorded in 1959, released in 1994
 Live at the Half Note: One Down, One Up, a 2005 compilation of 1965 radio broadcasts from the Half Note Club

See also
 At the Half Note Cafe, a 1960 album by Donald Byrd
 Jazz Alive! A Night at the Half Note, a 1959 album by Zoot Sims, Al Cohn and Phil Woods